Podolany  is a suburban neighbourhood of the city of Poznań in western Poland, located in the north-west of the city. Podolany was incorporated into the city partly in 1933, and partly under German occupation in 1940–42. It is mainly a residential district, but its southern parts contain industrial sites.

Podolany is one of the 42 osiedles into which Poznań is divided (see Administrative division of Poznań). It is a part of the former wider district of Jeżyce.

Podolany is bounded to the west by the main railway line running northwards towards Piła. In the north-west corner of the district is the station Poznań Strzeszyn (named after Strzeszyn, a neighbourhood further to the west). Podolany is also served by a number of bus routes connecting it with the city centre.

Neighbourhoods of Poznań